Arthur Duncombe may refer to:

Arthur Duncombe (Royal Navy officer), British naval commander and Conservative politician
Arthur Duncombe (1840–1911), British Conservative politician, son of the above